The 2008 Radivoj Korać Cup is the 6th season of the Serbian men's national basketball cup tournament. The Žućko's Left Trophy was awarded to the winner Partizan Igokea from Belgrade.

Venue

Qualified teams

1 League table position after 11 rounds played

Draw 
The draw was held in Belgrade on 16 January 2008.

Bracket

Quarterfinals

Semifinals

Final

See also 
 2007–08 Basketball League of Serbia
 Milan Ciga Vasojević Cup

References

External links 
 History of Radivoj Korać Cup

Radivoj Korać Cup
Radivoj
Serbia